Peter Ďungel (born 6 September 1993) is a Slovak professional footballer who currently plays for MŠK Považská Bystrica, on loan from MFK Tatran Liptovský Mikuláš.

Club career

FK Senica
Ďungel made his Fortuna Liga debut for Senica against FC DAC 1904 Dunajská Streda on 18 February 2018 against DAC Dunajská Streda in a home 0:2 defeat.

References

External links
 FK Senica official club profile
 
 Futbalnet profile

1993 births
Living people
People from Žilina District
Sportspeople from the Žilina Region
Slovak footballers
Slovak expatriate footballers
Association football midfielders
MŠK Žilina players
MFK Tatran Liptovský Mikuláš players
MŠK Fomat Martin players
FK Pohronie players
FK Senica players
Stal Mielec players
MFK Ružomberok players
MŠK Považská Bystrica (football) players
Slovak Super Liga players
2. Liga (Slovakia) players
3. Liga (Slovakia) players
4. Liga (Slovakia) players
I liga players
Expatriate footballers in Poland
Slovak expatriate sportspeople in Poland